is a Japanese investor who has been the President and CEO of Mizuho Financial Group (2002–2009) and Chairman of the Japanese Bankers Association (2005–2006). He’s currently the president of NHK.

Maeda was born in Kumamoto, raised in Nakatsu, Ōita and graduated from the University of Tokyo with a degree in law.

Maeda joined Fuji Bank in 1968. He became vice-president of Fuji Bank, the predecessor of the present Mizuho Financial Group, in 1999. The bank recorded a loss of 2.38 trillion JPY that fiscal year as it wrote off non-performing loans accrued during three recessions in a decade. Maeda returned it to profitability the next year after reducing bad assets and through gains on investments in Japanese stocks.

Maeda was named "Top chief executive officer" in Japanese banking sector in 2007, according to Institutional Investor magazine.

Personal life 
Maeda is an amateur gardener who does not use air conditioners at his home during Tokyo's humid summers to make an environmental point.

References

External links 
 Mizuho Financial Group : Top Message

1945 births
Living people
Japanese bankers
Japanese chief executives
People from Nakatsu, Ōita
University of Tokyo alumni
Fuji Bank